The 2010 CCHA Men's Ice Hockey Tournament is the 39th CCHA Men's Ice Hockey Tournament. It was played between March 5 and March 20, 2010 at campus locations and at Joe Louis Arena in Detroit, Michigan, United States. The winning team, the University of Michigan Wolverines, received the Mason Cup and earned the Central Collegiate Hockey Association's automatic bid to the 2010 NCAA Division I Men's Ice Hockey Tournament.

Format
The tournament features four rounds of play. In the first round, the fifth and twelfth, sixth and eleventh, seventh and tenth, and eighth and ninth seeds as determined by the final regular season standings play a best-of-three series, with the winner advancing to the quarterfinals. There, the first seed and lowest-ranked first-round winner, the second seed and second-lowest-ranked first-round winner, the third seed and second-highest-ranked first-round winner, and the fourth seed and highest-ranked first-round winner play a best-of-three series, with the winner advancing to the semifinals. In the semifinals, the highest and lowest seeds and second-highest and second-lowest seeds play a single game, with the winner advancing to the championship game and the loser advancing to the third-place game. The tournament champion receives an automatic bid to the 2010 NCAA Men's Division I Ice Hockey Tournament.

Regular season standings
Note: GP = Games played; W = Wins; L = Losses; T = Ties; PTS = Points; GF = Goals For; GA = Goals Against

Bracket

Note: * denotes overtime period(s)

First round

(5) Alaska vs. (12) Western Michigan

(6) Nebraska-Omaha vs. (11) Bowling Green

(7) Michigan vs. (10) Lake Superior State

(8) Ohio State vs. (9) Notre Dame

Quarterfinals

(1) Miami vs. (8) Ohio State

(2) Michigan State vs. (7) Michigan

(3) Ferris State vs. (6) Nebraska-Omaha

(4) Northern Michigan vs. (5) Alaska

Semifinals

(1) Miami vs. (7) Michigan

(3) Ferris State vs. (4) Northern Michigan

Third place

(1) Miami vs. (3) Ferris State

Championship

(7) Michigan vs. (4) Northern Michigan

Tournament awards

All-Tournament Team
F Carl Hagelin (Michigan)
F Ray Kaunisto (Northern Michigan)
F Louie Caporusso (Michigan)
D Steven Kampfer (Michigan)
D Eric Gustaffson (Northern Michigan)
G Shawn Hunwick* (Michigan)
* Most Valuable Player(s)

References

External links
2010 CCHA Men's Ice Hockey Tournament

Ccha Men's Ice Hockey Tournament
CCHA Men's Ice Hockey Tournament